The Great Cessation is the fifth full-length album by American band YOB. It was released in July 2009 under Profound Lore and it the first release after reuniting.

The album was reissued on December 8, 2017, with remastered audio by Heba Kadry and new artwork, as well as two extra tracks.

Track listing

Personnel
Music
 Mike Scheidt - vocal, guitars
 Aaron Rieseberg - bass
 Travis Foster - drums
 Sanford Parker - synthesizer

Production
 Billy Barnett - mastering
 Sanford Parker - engineer, mixing, producer
 Mike Schiedt - producer

Design
 Aaron Edge - construction, design, logo

References

Yob (band) albums
2009 albums